Sun Shengnan and Xu Yifan were the defending champions, but both chose not to participate. 
Ayumi Oka and Akiko Yonemura defeated Rika Fujiwara and Tamarine Tanasugarn in the final 6–3, 5–7, [10–8].

Seeds

Draw

Draw

References
 Main Draw
 Qualifying Doubles

Kurume Best Amenity International Women's Tennis - Doubles
Kurume Best Amenity Cup